Django is a software program for engraving of tabulature for lutes, archlute, theorbo and other early plucked and bowed instruments. It may be an earlier or later version of "Fandango" software. It was created by the French composer, lutenist, and programmer Alain Veylit. It is currently the only program that produces tabulature in Braille.

See also
Fronimo (software)

References

External links
 Official website
 http://www.delcamp.net/liens/classical_guitar_software.html
 http://www.cs.dartmouth.edu/~wbc/lute/tablature.html

Lutes
Shareware